Elections to the French National Assembly were held in the Comoros on 2 June 1946. The territory elected a single seat, won unopposed by Saïd Mohamed Cheikh.

Results

References

Comoros
1946 06
1946 in the Comoros